Saint Juliana may refer to:

People
 Saint Juliana (died 270), martyred with her brother Paul (see Paul and Juliana)
 Saint Juliana of Nicomedia (died 304), virgin and martyr

 Saint Juliana of Liège (1193–1252), also known as St. Juliana of Mt. Cornillon
 Saint Juliana of Lazarevo (1530–1604), Russian Orthodox saint
 Saint Juliana Falconieri (1270–1341), Italian foundress of the Servite Third Order
 Julian of Norwich (1342–1416), one of the greatest English mystics
 Juliana Olshanskaya (c. 1525 - c. 1540), Eastern Orthodox saint from the Olshanski family
 Sts. Juliana and Semproniana are martyrs associated with the legend of Saint Cucuphas

Places
 St. Juliana's Abbey in the Netherlands
 St. Juliana School, an Archdiocese of Chicago elementary school

See also
 Juliana (disambiguation)
 Julia (disambiguation)

Juliana